Deathprod is the musical pseudonym used by Norwegian artist Helge Sten for his ambient music project. He is married to Norwegian singer Susanna Wallumrød.

Biography
Sten began creating music under this name starting in 1991, culminating with a box set of most of his recorded work being released in 2004. Simply titled Deathprod, the collection contains three albums along with a bonus disc of previously unreleased, rare, and deleted tracks.

On recordings, Sten is usually credited with "Audio Virus", a catchall term for "homemade electronics, old tape echo machines, ring modulators, filters, theremins, samplers and lots of electronic stuff."

Sten also did the mixing of the album PB by the Norwegian artist Per Bergersen.

Sten is a member of Supersilent and works as a producer on many releases on the Norwegian label Rune Grammofon.
He has also produced Motorpsycho and has worked with Biosphere on an Arne Nordheim tribute album called Nordheim Transformed.

Discography
Deathprod, self-released demo tape
Treetop Drive 1–3, Towboat (1994), Metal Art Disco
Imaginary Songs from Tristan da Cunha (1996), dBUT Records
Nordheim Transformed (with Biosphere) (1998), Rune Grammofon
Morals and Dogma (2004), Rune Grammofon
Deathprod (2004), Rune Grammofon
6-track 10" remix album (2006), Rune Grammofon
Occulting Disk (2019), Smalltown Supersound
Dark Transit EP (2019), Smalltown Supersound
Sow Your Gold in the White Foliated Earth (2022),  Smalltown Supersound
Compositions (2023),  Smalltown Supersound

See also 

List of ambient music artists

References

External links
 Rune Grammofon

Motorpsycho members
Norwegian male guitarists
Ambient musicians
Norwegian rock guitarists
Norwegian record producers
Rune Grammofon artists
1971 births
Living people
Supersilent members